Ancrum is a surname. Notable people with the surname include:
 David Ancrum (born 1958), American retired professional and college basketball player
 Marion Ancrum (fl. 1885–1919), Scottish watercolour artist
 William Ancrum ( – 1808), American merchant and indigo planter

See also
 Ancrum, a village in the Borders area of Scotland
 Earl of Ancrum, a subsidiary title of the Marquess of Lothian in the Peerage of Scotland